Henry A. Hammel (September 20, 1840 – November 29, 1902) was a Union Army soldier in the American Civil War who received the U.S. military's highest decoration, the Medal of Honor.

Hammel was born in Germany on September 20, 1840, and entered service at St. Louis, Missouri. He was awarded the Medal of Honor for extraordinary heroism, while a sergeant in Battery A, 1st Missouri Light Artillery, on April 28 and 29, 1863, on board the steamer Cheeseman at Grand Gulf, Mississippi. His Medal of Honor was issued on March 10, 1896.

He died at the age of 62, on November 29, 1902, and was buried at the Bellefontaine Cemetery in St. Louis, Missouri.

Medal of Honor citation

See also
Battery A, 1st Missouri Light Artillery

Notes

References

External links

1840 births
1902 deaths
American Civil War recipients of the Medal of Honor
Burials in Missouri
German-born Medal of Honor recipients
German emigrants to the United States
Union Army soldiers
United States Army Medal of Honor recipients